Showcase is a North American retail company specializing in emerging trends in health, beauty, home, and toys, and the winner of Canada's Best Managed Companies in 2021 and 2022 as well as the winner of the RCC Excellence in Retailing Omni-Channel Award in 2022. There are 150 locations in major malls across Canada and the USA, an e-commerce portal called ShopAtShowcase.com, and plans to expand rapidly across the US.  The hashtag #ShowcaseMadeMeBuyIt has 130 million views on Tiktok  and has more than 400,000 followers.

History 

The first Showcase store was opened in 1994 in the Meadowlark Centre in Edmonton, Alberta.  In 2000, the company aggressively expanded at an average of five openings per year.  At this time, the company was primarily franchise-based, and modeled primarily as an infomercial outlet store.  The Edmonton Journal covered the grand openings of subsequent stores in the Edmonton area as the chain grew.

Starting in 2003, the company redesigned stores and began to launch proprietary product lines such as Dream Away, Quantum, and Kyoto and expanded beyond infomercial boundaries, and officially changed its name to “Showcase”.

Current Brand Position 

Today, Showcase specializes in viral trends popularized by social media and that are typically, new, exclusive, and hard-to-find.  This includes health, beauty, home, toy, tech, and food trends on popular socia media platforms such as TikTok, Facebook, and Instagram.    Showcase recently updated its store design and branding to "The Home of the Hottest Trends". A flagship store, displaying the new store design and branding, was opened in Sherway Gardens in 2018, followed by Toronto Eaton Centre in 2021, and Woodfield Mall in Chicago in 2022.

According to the Corporate Overview on the company's website, they are in the midst of strategizing an expansion to the US, with an ultimate goal of rolling out 100 US stores by 2024.  Ten pilot stores originally opened in the Northeast in 2018-19, including King Of Prussia outside of Philadelphia, with locations in Connecticut, Delaware, New Jersey, New York and Pennsylvania, followed by 31 more stores across the USA in 2022.

In May 2021, Showcase was named one of Canada's Best Managed Companies for 2021.  Showcase won again in 2022.  The program is sponsored by Deloitte and Canadian Business.

Pivot during COVID-19 

Showcase pivoted in March 2020 to become a leading retailer of Personal Protective Equipment (PPE) to support first responders, health care workers, and the general public.  Showcase was declared an essential service in most parts of Canada, and stayed open nation-wide during Canada's lockdowns that lasted from March to June 2020.  This pivot led to lineups across Canada as Showcase filled a vital need of the community.     Showcase also received a COVID-19 Site License and a Medical Device Establishment License from Health Canada.  Showcase's PPE pivot and record performance was featured in Retail Insider magazine.

Media 

Showcase has been covered in the media usually during the Christmas holiday season as a place to find unique gifts or to find out in person how the novel and unique products “really work”.  This interest has been generated because these products are not typically available for customers to try until they have been purchased, usually from the U.S., while in store customers are able to test the products for themselves or receive a demonstration.  Showcase has been featured on:

Corporate media 

 Canadian Business - Best Managed Companies 2021  
CBC interview with Samir Kulkarni - The digitization of infomercials 
Voice of Retail Podcast interview with Samir Kulkarni 
ICSC.org, “U.S. a big draw for international retailers eager to expand”
 Inc. magazine, “7 Ways to Spot Trends From the Man Who Turned Trendhunting Into Retail Gold”
 Brampton Board of Trade 2018 Business Excellence Award (Retail) - Winner
 2018 Deloitte Best Managed Companies – Finalist
 2017 Global Innovation Awards YPO/YPO Gold – Top 10 Finalist
 Brampton Board of Trade 2016 Business Excellence Award (Teamwork) - Finalist
 Brampton Board of Trade 2016 Business Excellence Award (Innovation) - Finalist
 Yale University Entrepreneurship Lecture, 2015
 Yale University Strategic Communication Lecture, 2015
 BNN Interview, 2014

Consumer media 

 CTV News on Jan 29 2021
Global News on Jan 22 2021
CTV News on Jan 13 2021
CTV News on Dec 16 2020 
Buzzfeed on Dec 8 2020 
CHCH Morning Live on May 31, 2018
 CHCH Hamilton on December 20, 2017
 CTV Calgary on December 20, 2017
 CTV Winnipeg on December 20, 2017
 CTV News on December 18, 2017
 CHCH Morning Live on December 14, 2017
 CTV Morning Live on November 30, 2017
 CTV Halifax Morning Live on November 24, 2017
 CTV Ottawa Morning Live on November 23, 2017
 Global Calgary on November 21, 2017
 CTV Calgary at Noon on November 21, 2017
 CTV News Vancouver on November 19, 2017
 CTV Morning Live on November 16, 2017
Breakfast Television on December 24, 2010
A-Channel Victoria on December 16, 2010
Global Television on December 2, 2008
Breakfast Television on November 25, 2008
CityNews on December 24, 200
Breakfast Television on December 17, 2007
Global Morning Show on December 14, 2007
Global News on December 6, 2007
Toronto Star on January 7, 2006

Proprietary brands 

Showcase owns various proprietary brands that sell in-store and online including:

 Gravity Blade - hoverboards and electric scooters
 Squishies - slow-rising foam toys
 Hidden Gems - jewellery candles and bath bombs
 Dream Away - bedding and weighted blankets
 Cloud9 - super-soft leisurewear and bedding
 Quantum - health and fitness
 Kyoto - eco-friendly products
 Esencia - aromatherapy and essential oils
 EcoTerra - eco-friendly products
 Peplos - shapewear and hair extensions

Canadian trademarks 

Although the ubiquitous red “as seen on TV” logo can be used by anyone, the tradename Showcase, As Seen on TV Showcase, TV Showcase, “The Best of As Seen on TV and more!” and its variants are protected by Canadian trademark law.  Showcase has applied for, and in most cases been granted, trademark registration for its various tradenames and proprietary brands with the Canadian Intellectual Property Office.  These include:

Showcase The Best of As Seen on TV and more

The best of as-seen-on-TV and more!

TV Showcase Products and Demonstration Stores

As Seen on TV Showcase

The Best of As Seen on TV and more!

As Seen on TV Showcase and Products and Demonstration Stores

Cloud 9 by Dream Away (design)

Cloud 9 by Dream Away (words)

Kyoto Environmental

Dream Away (design)

Dream Away (words)

Kyoto Environmental

Why dream when you can Dream Away?

You Saw It on TV

Don’t Just Dream … Dream Away!

Eco Savvy

Quantum (design)	

Quantum (words)

Squishies (words)

Slow Rise Squishies (words)

American trademarks 

Showcase has also registered, or applied for, various trademarks with the United States Patent and Trademark Office, as follows:

Showcase

Showcase The Best of As Seen on TV and more!

The Best of As Seen on TV and more!

Kyoto Environmental

Cloud 9 by Dream Away

Kyoto Environmental Eco Savvy

Quantum

References

External links
  
  Showcase on Global Television, December 2, 2008
  Showcase on Breakfast Television, November 25, 2008
  Showcase on CityNews, December 24, 2007
  Showcase on Global Morning Show, December 14, 2007
  Infomercial Ratings, a product review site

Retail companies of Canada
Retail companies established in 1994